Luci Island (also Loutz Island  (Lu-tzʻu, Lucih) and Lusi Island (Lusih, Lu-ssu) is an uninhabited island southeast of the Asian mainland in Pinghai Town, Xiuyu District, Putian, Fujian, People's Republic of China (PRC) and  north-northwest of Wuciou Township (Ockseu), Kinmen County (Quemoy), Republic of China (Taiwan) which can be seen from the island.

History
In 1991, the island was rented to Hong Kong businessmen to be made into a resort, and a dock and several unfinished buildings were built.

In January 2019, notice was given of the navigational hazard of the ship Xinhangjun which sunk in the waters near the island.

On June 16, 2019, a wind power plant on the island started operation.

Economy
The sea surrounding the island produces Chinese white shrimp, croceine croaker, ribbonfish, swimming crab and lobster. Stone buildings on the island are used by fishermen as temporary residences.

Gallery
Maps including Luci Island:

See also
 List of islands of Fujian
 List of uninhabited islands

References

Islands of Fujian
Populated places in Fujian